Chiriba (Chiriva) is a poorly attested language of Moxos Province, Bolivia which may have belonged to the Panoan family.  All that was recorded of it was a list of seven words; several of these resemble Panoan languages, especially Pakawara, and none resemble other language families. Unattested Chumana is reported to have been related.

Vocabulary
Chíriva word list from the late 1790s published in Palau and Saiz (1989):

{| class="wikitable"
! Spanish gloss !! English gloss !! Chíriva
|-
| bueno || good || sheoma
|-
| malo || bad || besoma
|-
| el padre || father || reomo
|-
| la madre || mother || yllquite
|-
| el hermano || brother || ycoyo
|-
| uno || one || tevisí
|-
| dos || two || jorová
|}

See also
Reyesano language

References

Panoan languages